Jaime is a 1999 Portuguese drama film directed by António-Pedro Vasconcelos. It was released on 9 April 1999.

Plot 
A woman takes her young son, leaves her husband and moves in with her lover. The boy, desperate to get his parents back together, becomes convinced that if only he can get his father's stolen motorcycle back everything will be fine again, so he sets out to get enough money to buy his father a new one. unsentimental tale about underage street kids in Portugal. The film opens with a teenage worker at a bakery getting dumped off at a hospital after losing his finger. The boss instructs the youth's father to tell the doctors that he lost his digit playing with a knife, but fearing an investigation, the boss subsequently dumps his other underage workers, including 13-year old Jaime (Saul Fonseca). Jaime is struggling to mend his tattered family. His mother threw his father out of the house and has taken up with a disreputable Brazilian. His heartbroken father moved into a shack and has been unemployed since his moped was stolen. Jaime's hopes that he could reunite his family by buying his dad a replacement scooter are dashed when the Brazilian steals his cash; Jaime subsequently moves out of his mom's place and in with his father. Meanwhile, Jaime and his sidekick Ulisses (Sandro Silva) sleep during their days at school and look for job opportunities at night.

Cast
Saul Fonseca
Sandro Silva
Fernanda Serrano
Joaquim Leitão
Nicolau Breyner

Reception

Accolades

References

External links

1999 drama films
1999 films
Films directed by António-Pedro Vasconcelos
Portuguese drama films
Golden Globes (Portugal) winners
1990s Portuguese-language films